Baros may refer to:
Baros (island), an island in the Maldives
Baros, Indonesia
Milan Baroš, Czech footballer
Intravenous sodium bicarbonate, by the trade name Baros